Jose A. Martin (1943 - November 22, 2006) was an American Thoroughbred horse racing trainer who trained three Champions as well as multiple Grade I winner, Noble Nashua.

Jose Martin was the son of U.S. Racing Hall of Fame trainer Frank "Pancho" Martin. He was also the father of trainer Carlos Martin.

A native of Havana, Cuba, Jose Martin came to the United in 1960 where his father was training horses. During the years learning the business from his father, he was away for two years, serving with the 82nd Airborne Division of United States Army. After being discharged, in 1967 he went out on his as a licensed Thoroughbred trainer.

In 1977, Jose Martin trained his first Eclipse Award winner when Lakeville Miss was voted American Champion Two-Year-Old Filly. He got his second with Wayward Lass in 1981 when she was American Champion Three-Year-Old Filly and his last with Groovy who, as at 2011, is the last horse to break the 130 Beyer Speed Figure having accomplished that milestone with 131 and 134 ratings in 1987 en route to be voted that year's American Champion Sprint Horse.

Diagnosed with lung cancer in 2002, on November 22, 2006, Jose Martin died at the North Shore University Hospital in Manhasset, New York.

References

1943 births
2006 deaths
Deaths from lung cancer
United States Air Force airmen
American horse trainers
People from Havana
People from New York (state)